The Newburgh Enlarged City School District is a public school district located in Newburgh, New York. It encompassed all of the City of Newburgh, and most of the Towns of Newburgh and New Windsor. The enrollment is 12,791 students in 13 schools in grades K-12.

Schools

Pre-K 
Washington Street
Most other elementary schools also provide Pre-K

Elementary

 Balmville School (K-5)
 Fostertown School (K-5)
 Gardnertown School (K-5)
 Gidney Avenue Memorial School (K-6)
 Horizons on the Hudson School (K-5)
 Meadow Hill School (K-8)
 New Windsor School (K-5)
 Temple Hill Academy (K-8)
 Vails Gate School (K-5)

Middle School (6-8)
 Heritage Middle School  
 South Middle School

High School (9-12)

Newburgh Free Academy
 NFA Main Campus
 NFA North Campus
 NFA West Campus

General Information and Demographics 
Student Body (as of 2012)
 24.9% Black or African American
 48.7% Hispanic or Latino
 2.4% Asian or Native Hawaiian/Other Pacific Islander
 21% White
As of 2012 56% percent of students were eligible for free lunch and 10% qualified for reduced price lunch.

14% of students are considered "Limited English Proficient"

History

As was the case with most rural upstate towns in New York, a series of schoolhouses (in most cases, one room) sprang up throughout Newburgh in the 19th century, in response to the state laws of 1812 and 1814 requiring the establishment of such schools and school districts. The number of these rural school districts in New York peaked statewide at 11,750 in 1865.

New York state legislation required that the administration of schools would be in the hands of school districts — not the counties or towns, as is the case in 20 other states.  This system of school districts totally independent of municipal or county governments remains in place throughout all of New York (except for New York City) today.

(In the mid-1930s, the City of Newburgh built and opened its first Junior High Schools, one for 7th to 9th Grade students living north of Broadway and/or First Streets, and another for students living south of that geography. Today, these schools have become "Middle Schools" in the N. E. S. D., for all intents and purposes.)

An 1875 map on display at Town Hall indicates that at that time 14 different school districts existed in Newburgh, each of which had its own schoolhouse, each of which elected its own school board, and each of which hired its own teachers. As late as the mid 1950s, it was common in the town for one teacher to teach more than one grade in one classroom.

In the post World War II era, with the first explosion in population in the town (as the town began the transition from rural to suburban) as well as with "Baby boomers" beginning their schooling, the need came about for larger and more modern school buildings.  During the 1950s, new elementary schools were built in Balmville, Gardnertown, East Coldenham, Leptondale and Union Grove.  Fostertown School retained its older building, but the first of several modern additions was constructed in 1957.

Each of these elementary schools had their own locally elected school boards. Each had clearly defined boundaries which determined which elementary school each student would attend. Attendance at high school was not universal prior to World War II, but after that time most Newburgh students attended the two junior high schools (North Junior High and South Junior High) and one high school (Newburgh Free Academy, popularly known as NFA) in the city of Newburgh.

From 1925 on, New York encouraged school districts to consolidate and approved legislation, featuring the incentive of state financial aid, to facilitate this. However, as late as 1960, there were still nine elementary school districts, and nine elementary schools, in the town. (The missing district numbers on the following chart are those of school districts previously consolidated with neighboring districts.)

The following are the nine school districts as they existed in 1960:

District One:        Balmville
District Three:     Orange Lake
District Four:       Fostertown
District Five:        Roseton
District Eight:      Gardnertown
District Nine:       Middle Hope
District Ten:        East Coldenham
District Eleven:   Union Grove
District Fourteen:  Leptondale

In 1963, the Newburgh Enlarged City School District was formed.  It consisted of the entire city of Newburgh and most of the town of New Windsor. In addition, it absorbed the following school districts within the town of Newburgh: Balmville (District One), Orange Lake (District Three), Fostertown (District Four), Gardnertown (District Eight), and Union Grove (District Eleven). At the same time, the Newburgh Enlarged City School District absorbed several elementary school districts in the Town of New Windsor, to the south.

The Newburgh Enlarged City School District took over ownership and management of the five elementary schools in the town of Newburgh absorbed by the school district as well as those in the Town of New Windsor. In addition, town of Newburgh and New Windsor students for the first time attended the junior high schools of the Newburgh Enlarged City School District and NFA without any special tuition having to be paid. Residents of these portions of the towns were afforded full privileges at the Newburgh Free Library free of charge.

References

External links
 
 Unofficial News and Information about NECSD

Newburgh, New York
School districts in New York (state)
Education in Orange County, New York